Marc Cucurella Saseta (born 22 July 1998) is a Spanish professional footballer who plays as a left-back for  club Chelsea and the Spain national team.

Cucurella made his senior club debut at Barcelona, but spent most of his time there in the reserve team. He went on to play over 100 La Liga games for Eibar and Getafe, before joining Brighton & Hove Albion in 2021. He spent a season with Brighton before joining Chelsea in 2022.

Cucurella was capped for Spain over every youth level from under-16 to under-23, winning the silver medal with the latter at the 2020 Olympic tournament. He made his debut for the senior team in 2021.

Club career

Barcelona
Cucurella was born in Alella, Barcelona, Catalonia. He started playing futsal with FS Alella before joining Espanyol's youth teams in 2006, and in 2012, he moved to Barcelona. On 26 November 2016, while still a junior, he made his senior debut with the reserves by starting in a 4–0 home win over L'Hospitalet in the Segunda División B.

Cucurella contributed with 17 appearances for the side, achieving promotion to the Segunda División via the play-offs. On 7 July 2017, he renewed his contract until 2021, with a €12 million clause. He made his professional debut on 1 September, starting in a 2–2 away draw against Granada. He made his first-team debut on 24 October, coming on as a late substitute for Lucas Digne in a 3–0 Copa del Rey away win against Real Murcia. He scored his first senior goal for Barcelona B on 17 March 2018, equalising in a draw away to Lorca.

On 31 August 2018, Cucurella was loaned to fellow La Liga club SD Eibar, for one year with a €2 million buyout clause. He made his top-flight debut on 25 September in a 1–0 loss away to Espanyol. Appearing as one of eight changes by manager José Luis Mendilibar, he was praised by Marca journalist Ander Barroso despite the result. He scored his first La Liga goal on the final day of the season on 9 May 2019, opening the scoring in 2–2 draw at home to his parent club.

Getafe
At the end of his loan, Eibar exercised Cucurella's clause, making him a permanent player for the Basque team; along with the transfer, Barcelona added a €4 million buyback option. On 16 July 2019, after just sixteen days as a permanent Eibar player, this clause was activated, only for him to be loaned to Getafe two days later for the upcoming season, with an option to buy for €6 million and 40% of the rights remaining to Barcelona.

Cucurella made his European debut on 19 September 2019 as a substitute for Kenedy in a 1–0 home win over Trabzonspor in the UEFA Europa League group stage. He played eight games of that campaign, which ended 11 months later with a 2–0 loss on aggregatre to Inter Milan in the last 16.

On 3 March 2020, Getafe triggered his option to buy for €6 million, no longer connecting him to Barcelona. The club fully exercised his option to buy on 30 June.

Brighton & Hove Albion
On 31 August 2021, Cucurella joined Premier League club Brighton & Hove Albion on a five-year contract. He made his debut for Brighton on 11 September, starting and playing 82 minutes before being substituted in the 1–0 away win over Brentford. Eight days later, he made his home debut, playing the whole of the 2–1 victory over Leicester City. His chipped cross set up Danny Welbeck's headed equaliser in added time, finishing 1–1 away to Chelsea on 29 December. On 7 May 2022, he scored his first goal for the club; he netted the second of a 4–0 win over Manchester United by shooting from Leandro Trossard's pull back. Three days later, at the club's end of season awards, Cucurella won Players' Player of the Season as well as being voted Player of the Season.

Chelsea
On 5 August 2022, Cucurella signed for Premier League club Chelsea on a six-year contract. The fee was reported to be worth an initial £55 million, potentially rising to £62 million in add-ons, which was a record fee received by Brighton. On 6 August, he made his debut as a substitute in a 1–0 away win against Everton in the Premier League. On 7 March 2023, he was named Player of the Match in the Champions League round of 16 second leg match against Borussia Dortmund, which ended in a 2–0 win and qualification to the quarter-final.

International career
On 25 March 2019, Cucurella debuted as a substitute for the non-FIFA Catalonia team in a 2–1 win over Venezuela in Girona. He was one of several new faces due to some clubs not releasing their players for the game.

In November 2020, manager Luis Enrique called up Cucurella to the senior Spain squad for UEFA Nations League games against Switzerland and Germany, as José Gayà was injured. He did not leave the bench for the fixtures.

Due to the isolation of some national team players following the positive COVID-19 test of Sergio Busquets, Spain's under-21 squad were called up for the international friendly against Lithuania on 8 June 2021. Cucurella made his senior debut in the match as Spain won 4–0.

Cucurella was part of the Spain under-23 team that won the silver medal at the 2020 Olympic Games, that took place in 2021 due to the previous year's postponement as a result of the COVID-19 pandemic.

Career statistics

Club

International

Honours
Barcelona
Copa del Rey: 2017–18

Spain U23
Summer Olympic silver medal: 2020

Individual
Brighton & Hove Albion Players' Player of the Season: 2021–22
Brighton & Hove Albion Player of the Season: 2021–22
 2015 UEFA European Under-17 Championship Team of the Tournament

References

External links

Profile at the Chelsea F.C. website

1998 births
Living people
People from Maresme
Sportspeople from the Province of Barcelona
Footballers from Catalonia
Spanish footballers
Association football defenders
FC Barcelona Atlètic players
FC Barcelona players
SD Eibar footballers
Getafe CF footballers
Brighton & Hove Albion F.C. players
Chelsea F.C. players
Segunda División B players
Segunda División players
La Liga players
Premier League players
Spain youth international footballers
Spain under-21 international footballers
Spain international footballers
Catalonia international footballers
Olympic footballers of Spain
Footballers at the 2020 Summer Olympics
Olympic medalists in football
Olympic silver medalists for Spain
Medalists at the 2020 Summer Olympics
Spanish expatriate footballers
Expatriate footballers in England
Spanish expatriate sportspeople in England